Photios II, (born Dimitrios Maniatis; 1874 – 29 December 1935) was Ecumenical Patriarch of Constantinople from 7 October 1929 until 26 December 1935.

Biography
He was born in 1874 and baptized as Dimitrios Maniatis. After finishing elementary education, he attended the Zariphios School in Philippopolis. He studied theology at the University of Athens and Philosophy at the University of Munich. He spoke Greek, Turkish, French, German and Bulgarian.

In 1902, he was named deacon. He remained in the Metropolis of Philippopolis, where he reached the rank of protosynkellos. Then was named Patriarchal Exarch of Philippopolis for the period 1906–1914.

In 1915, he was elected assistant bishop of Eirinoupolis.

On 7 October 1929, he was elected Ecumenical Patriarch and assigned to his post on the same day. During his Patriarchy, the relations between Greece and Turkey improved thanks to the political actions of Eleftherios Venizelos and Kemal Atatürk.  The patriarch Photios II died on 29 December 1935.

External links
Photios II biography at the Ecumenical Patriarchate web site

20th-century Ecumenical Patriarchs of Constantinople
1874 births
1935 deaths
National and Kapodistrian University of Athens alumni
People from Princes' Islands